Strange Invasion (Extraña invasión), also known as Stay Tuned for Terror, is a 1965 Argentine-American science fiction film directed by Emilio Vieyra and starring Richard Conte, Jorge Rivera López, Eddie Pequenino, Anna Strasberg and Mónica Cahen D'Anvers. A young Adolfo Aristarain was assistant director during filming.

Plot

In Clearview, a town in the South of the U.S., strange waves begin to appear on the TV sets, hypnotizing the very young and the very old. Children and old people begin to wander around town in a zombie-like state. When the signal drops, there is a violent reaction and the army must be called in.

Cast 
 Richard Conte
 Jorge Rivera López
 Eddie Pequenino
 Eduardo Muñoz 
 Anna Strasberg (as Anna Mizrahi)
 Ignacio de Soroa
 Sergio Vandes
 Edmundo Sanders
 Susana Beltrán 
 Emilio Vieyra
 Mónica Cahen D'Anvers (as Monica Mihánovich)

Location
The film was filmed entirely in Ciudad Jardin.

External links 
 

1965 films
1960s Spanish-language films
1960s science fiction horror films
American horror films
Argentine independent films
Argentine science fiction films
1960s American films
1960s Argentine films
Films directed by Emilio Vieyra